Rafael Afonso de Sousa (born 1900, date of death unknown) was a Portuguese modern pentathlete and sports shooter. He competed at the 1932 Summer Olympics.

References

1900 births
Year of death missing
Portuguese male modern pentathletes
Portuguese male sport shooters
Olympic modern pentathletes of Portugal
Olympic shooters of Portugal
Modern pentathletes at the 1932 Summer Olympics
Shooters at the 1932 Summer Olympics